Flügge is the surname of:
Johannes Flüggé (1775–1816), German botanist and physician 
Carl Flügge (1847-1923), German bacteriologist
Irmgard Flügge-Lotz (1903-1974), German mathematician
Siegfried Flügge (1912-1997), German physicist
Wilhelm Flügge (1904–1990), German engineer